Scipio Township, Indiana may refer to one of the following places:

 Scipio Township, Allen County, Indiana
 Scipio Township, LaPorte County, Indiana

See also

Scipio Township (disambiguation)

Indiana township disambiguation pages